Pacores or Pakores (Greek: ΠΑΚΟΡΗϹ Pakorēs; Kharosthi: 𐨤𐨐𐨂𐨪 , ; Aramaic:  pkwry) (100–135 AD) was a king who ruled the remnants of the Indo-Parthian Kingdom in Arachosia from 100–130 AD following Ubouzanes. He was an Indo-Parthian king.  He is well-known from coins minted in Seistan and Kandahar, mostly silver drachms and tetradrachms. The time of his reign can be determined as many of his coins over strike those of Vima Takto.

He is the last well attested ruler. After his coins there is a single surviving coin with the name Abdagases II and a set of poorly made Indo-Parthian coins with unnamed rulers before the Kushan Empire conquered it.

References

Christine Fröhlich. "Indo-Parthian Dynasty." Encyclopædia Iranica.

Indo-Parthian kings
2nd-century monarchs in Asia
2nd-century Iranian people
Zoroastrian rulers